St. Louis Place Park is a long and linear municipal park, encompassing 9 and a half blocks between 21st Street and Rauschenbach Ave.

Geography
St. Louis Place Park is located in the neighborhood of St. Louis Place.

Surrounding areas
It is lined by handsome but generally modest townhouses and bungalows, along with several churches, a civic building, and an Art Deco fire station that is still in service today.

See also
People and culture of St. Louis, Missouri
Neighborhoods of St. Louis
Parks in St. Louis, Missouri

References

External links

Place Park
Culture of St. Louis
Place Park
1850 establishments in Missouri